Daphniphyllum griffithianum is a tree species in the family Daphniphyllaceae. It is native to an area from Nusa Tenggara, Indonesia to Thailand.

Taxonomy
The species is in section Lunata of Daphniphyllum, along with D. calycinum and D. majus.

This current species was described by the botanist Henry John Noltie (born 1957) in 2005, in the publication Regnum Vegatibile: a Series of Handbooks for the Use of Plant Taxonomists and Plant Geographers (Utrecht). This was a re-working of the taxa, originally named by the Scottish surgeon and botanist Robert Wight (1796-1872) as Goughia griffithiana in 1852. Wight was a leading plant taxonomist of South India.

Distribution
It is native to an area from Nusa Tenggara, Indonesia to Thailand. Countries and regions that it has been recorded are: Indonesia (Nusa Tenggara, Kalimantan, Sumatera); Malaysia (Sabah, Sarawak, Peninsular Malaysia); and Thailand.

Habitat and ecology
The species is of low-moderate abundance in the peat swamp forest of PT National Sago Prima of PT Sampoerna Agro tbk, Kepulauan Meranti Regency, Riau Province, Sumatera. This forest was logged some 28 years before study. This is enough time for the vegetation community to return to primary forest but there is still a considerable presence of secondary forest taxa. The most important taxa at the time of study were Benstonea atrocarpa and Blumeodendron subrotundifolium

Further reading
Girmansyah et al, 2013, Flora of Bali an annotated checklist
Govaerts, 2011, World checklist of selected plant families

References

griffithianum
Flora of Borneo
Flora of Peninsular Malaysia
Flora of Sumatra
Flora of Thailand
Flora of the Lesser Sunda Islands
Plants described in 2005